Hadj Bouguèche (born December 7, 1983 in Arzew) is an Algerian football player.

Club career
On July 16, 2010, it was announced that Bouguèche signed a two-year contract with Emirati-side Emirates Club, joining the club on a free transfer. On August 20, 2010, Bougueche made his debut for the club starting in the 3–1 win over Al Wahda in the 2010 UAE Super Cup.

On July 13, 2011, Bouguèche signed a one-year contract with Saudi Professional League side Al-Qadisiyah FC. Bouguèche moved to Al-Nassr club on January 21, 2012, they lost final in the 2012 King Cup of Champions against Al-Ahli losing 4-1 scores. His standing record in Al-Qadisiyah and Al-Nassr is 23 appearances and 12 goals. Bouguèche signed with Al-Taawon club.

International career
On August 17, 2004, Bouguèche received his first cap for the Algerian National Team as a starter in a friendly against Burkina Faso. In the 54th minute of the game, he provided an assist for Salim Arrache. The game ended 2-2. Two weeks later, he was called up to the team, this time for the 2006 FIFA World Cup qualifier against Gabon. With the team losing 2–0, Bouguèche was inserted into the game as a 79th-minute substitute for Slimane Raho. However, Gabon added a third goal in the 88th minute and won the game 3–0.

Honours
Won the Algerian Cup twice with MC Alger in 2006 and 2007
Won the Algerian Super Cup twice with MC Alger in 2006 and 2007
Won the Algerian League once with MC Alger in 2009-2010
Won the UAE Super Cup once with Emirates Club in 2010
Top scorer of the Algerian Championnat National once with MC Alger in 2009–2010 with 17 goals
Has 3 caps for the Algerian National Team

National team statistics

References

External links

1983 births
Algerian footballers
Algeria international footballers
Algerian expatriate footballers
Algerian expatriate sportspeople in Saudi Arabia
Al Nassr FC players
Algerian expatriate sportspeople in the United Arab Emirates
Algeria A' international footballers
Algeria under-23 international footballers
Emirates Club players
Expatriate footballers in the United Arab Emirates
Expatriate footballers in Saudi Arabia
Living people
MC Alger players
USM Blida players
RC Kouba players
Al-Qadsiah FC players
Al-Taawoun FC players
USM El Harrach players
USM Bel Abbès players
Saudi Professional League players
UAE First Division League players
WA Tlemcen players
Association football forwards
21st-century Algerian people